The fiery-capped manakin (Machaeropterus pyrocephalus) is a species of bird in the family Pipridae, the manakins. It is one of the five species in the genus Machaeropterus. It is named for its bright yellow head feathers.

Distribution and habitat
The fiery-capped manakin is found in the southern Amazon Basin of Brazil, southeast Peru, and northern Bolivia; also Venezuela. Its natural habitat is subtropical or tropical moist lowland forest.

Its range is in the south-central Amazon Basin, then spreads east–west, and is mostly associated with River drainages. The range, shaped like an inverted "Y" starts at the Amazon River outlet in southern Amapá state and Pará. At the Tapajós-Amazon River confluence, the range goes south, upstream on the Tapajós and forks east–west. The eastern range extends to the upstream third of the Xingu River, then further east to the upstream half of the Araguaia in the Araguaia-Tocantins River system. The range narrows eastward another 600 km at the very headwaters of the adjacent Tocantins River.

The westward extension of the range covers northern Amazonian Bolivia, the tributary headwaters to the northeast-flowing Madeira River; the range continues through southeast and central Amazonian Peru beyond the north-flowing Amazon River tributary, the Ucayali River.

Two small disjunct populations of the fiery-capped manakin occur; one in northeast Roraima state on the south-flowing Branco River; the other further northwest on the lower reaches of the Caribbean-flowing Orinoco River in east-central Venezuela, 500 km upstream.

References

External links
 
Fiery-capped manakin photo gallery VIREO Photo-High Res
Photo-Extreme High Res(Close-up); Article fotonatura.org–("Galeria-Personal"-Quispe) Thumb-Photo

fiery-capped manakin
Birds of the Amazon Basin
Birds of the Peruvian Amazon
Birds of the Bolivian Amazon
fiery-capped manakin
fiery-capped manakin
Taxonomy articles created by Polbot